The Lagos State Ministry of Commerce and Industry is the state government ministry, charged with the responsibility to plan, devise and implement the state policies on Commerce and Industry. This ministry was established to ensure business Prosperity and Consumer Satisfaction in Lagos state. The head office of the agency is located at Block 8, The Secretariat, Obafemi Awolowo Way, Alausa, Ikeja, Lagos state.

Activities 

 Lagos State Ministry of Commerce, Industry and Cooperatives registered 247 new cooperatives and revalidated 2359mcooperatives societies
 The ministry through  the Lagos State Cooperative College is accredited has organized various human capacity-building programmes for over 4000 cooperators in Lagos state.

See also
Lagos State Ministry of Science and Technology
Lagos State Executive Council

References

Government ministries of Lagos State
Economy of Lagos State
Lagos
Lagos